Oxygenated treatment (OT) is a technique used to reduce corrosion in a boiler and its associated feedwater system in flow-through boilers.

With oxygenated treatment, oxygen is injected into the feedwater to keep the oxygen level between 30-50 ppb. OT programs are most commonly used in supercritical (ie >3250psi) power boilers. The ability to change an existing sub-critical boiler over to an OT program is very limited. "Common injection points are just after the condensate polisher and again at the deaerator outlet." This forms a thicker protective layer of hematite (Fe2O3) on top of the magnetite. This is a denser, flatter film (vs. the undulation scale with OT) so that there is less resistance to water flow compared to AVT.  Also, OT reduces the risk of flow-accelerated corrosion.

Comparison of AVT to OT

See also 
 Heat recovery steam generator (HRSG)
 Flow-accelerated corrosion (FAC)
 Oxygen scavenger
 All volatile treatment (AVT)

References

Water treatment